Vladislav Zvara (born 11 December 1971) is a Slovak former footballer who played for Tatran Prešov, 1. FC Košice, Artmedia Petržalka and he ended career in HFC Humenné. Zvara played 29 times for Slovakia.

References

External links

1971 births
Living people
Slovak footballers
1. FC Tatran Prešov players
FC Spartak Trnava players
MFK Ružomberok players
ŠK Futura Humenné players
FC VSS Košice players
FC Petržalka players
Slovak Super Liga players
Slovakia international footballers
Sportspeople from Spišská Nová Ves

Association football midfielders